Now is a studio album by the Jamaican reggae band Black Uhuru. It was released in 1990 through Rhino Records. The album peaked at number 121 on the US Billboard 200 chart, number 2 on the World Albums chart, and was nominated for Grammy Award for Best Reggae Recording at 33rd Annual Grammy Awards.

Track listing 

Notes
 Track 10 is a cover of "Hey Joe", written by Billy Roberts and performed by Jimi Hendrix.

Personnel 

 Derrick Simpson – lead vocals, composer
 Ived "Sen-C" Campbell – backing vocals
 Frank Stepanek – lead guitar
 Leebert "Gibby" Morrison – bass (tracks: 1-4, 7-9)
 Christopher Meridith – bass (tracks: 5, 10)
 Wrong Devon – bass (track 6)
 Noel Davis – piano
 Marcus "Rangatan" Smith – drums (tracks: 1-4, 7-9)
 Anthony Brissett – piano, keyboards, drums (tracks: 5, 10), producer
 Sydney Wolfe – percussion
 Christopher "Sky Juice" Burth – percussion
 Terry Rindal – executive producer, producer
 Steven J. C. Stanley – engineering
 David Rowe – engineering
 Antoine Salassie – engineering
 Collin "Bulby" York – assistant engineering
 Lynford "Fatta" Marshall – assistant engineering
 George Nauful – coordinator
 Kathleen Cascone – art direction & design
 Benjamin Groeper – photography
 Conley Major – photography

Charts

References

External links 

1990 albums
Black Uhuru albums